The Biesdorf Palace is a Neoclassical-style building in Marzahn-Hellersdorf, Berlin. Constructed in 1868, Werner von Siemens acquired the palace in 1887. However, in 1889 he handed the building over to his son, Georg Wilhelm von Siemens. Damaged in World War II, the building was reconstructed on the basis of its original appearance, with the work being completed in 2016.

Bibliography
Josef Batzhuber. "Schloss und Park Biesdorf, Stadtbezirk Marzahn-Hellersdorf", in Bund Heimat und Umwelt in Deutschland: Weißbuch der historischen Gärten und Parks in den neuen Bundesländern. Bonn: 2005. pp. 29–31.

External links
 "Schloß Biesdorf", history and data about the Biesdorf Palace at the official website of the city of Berlin (in German)

Houses completed in 1868
Palaces in Berlin
Neoclassical architecture in Germany
Prussian cultural sites